Jonathan Mumford (1842 – 14 December 1892) was a New Zealand cricketer. He played four first-class matches for Auckland between 1873 and 1878.

Mumford captained the Auckland United senior club team for about 20 years. He was the manager and groundsman of the cricket grounds in the Auckland Domain for many years, having been among the group of men who were instrumental in the formation of the grounds. He died suddenly while playing cricket.

See also
 List of Auckland representative cricketers

References

External links
 

1842 births
1892 deaths
New Zealand cricketers
Auckland cricketers
People from Ealing
Cricketers from Greater London
Groundskeepers